Hans Niggl (1908 – 9 January 1943) was a Swiss sprinter. He competed in the men's 200 metres at the 1928 Summer Olympics.

References

1908 births
1943 deaths
Athletes (track and field) at the 1928 Summer Olympics
Swiss male sprinters
Olympic athletes of Switzerland
Place of birth missing